The Nyangatom also known as Donyiro and pejoratively as Bumé are Nilotic agro-pastoralists inhabiting the border of southwestern Ethiopia, southeastern South Sudan, and the Ilemi Triangle.  They speak the Nyangatom language.

Overview
The Nyangatom are members of the Ateker or Karamojong cluster that also contains the Turkana, Toposa, Karamojong, and Jie who speak closely related languages. They number approximately 30,000  with populations in both South Sudan and Ethiopia. Many Nyangatom are nomadic, residing in mobile livestock villages that may migrate several times a year. A substantial number of Nyangatom also reside in semi-permanent villages. It is common for individuals to move between mobile cattle camps and semi-permanent villages.

The Nyangatom have intermittent conflict with many of their neighbors, especially the Turkana, Dassanetch, and Suri. Despite the risk of intergroup conflict, many Nyangatom have bond friends with members of other groups and there are trade relationships between the Nyangatom and many of their neighbors.

Along with other groups in the Lower Omo Valley, the Nyangatom face challenges to their future subsistence and cultural traditions due to large-scale agricultural projects occurring in their territory.

External links

 BBC program Tribe, July 2006
 Website for Nyangatom Anthropology
 Nyangatom in danger of denial of access or displacement

References

Ethnic groups in Ethiopia
Ethnic groups in South Sudan
Ethiopia–South Sudan relations